I Dood It (UK title By Hook or by Crook) is a 1943 American musical-comedy film starring Red Skelton and Eleanor Powell, directed by Vincente Minnelli, and released by Metro-Goldwyn-Mayer. The screenplay is by Fred Saidy and Sig Herzig and the film features Richard Ainley, Patricia Dane, Lena Horne, and Hazel Scott. John Hodiak plays a villain in this production, just his third movie role. Jimmy Dorsey and his Orchestra provide musical interludes.

Cast 
 Red Skelton as Joseph Rivington Renolds
 Eleanor Powell as Constance Shaw
 Richard Ainley as Larry West
 Patricia Dane as Suretta Brenton
 Sam Levene as Ed Jackson
 Jimmy Dorsey as Jimmy Dorsey
 Thurston Hall as Kenneth Lawlor
 Lena Horne as Lena Horne
 Hazel Scott as Hazel Scott
 John Hodiak as Roy Hartwood
 Butterfly McQueen as Annette
 Charles Judels as Stage Manager
 Lionel Braham as Mr. Gillingham (uncredited)

Production
Powell's most notable performance in the film comes near the beginning when she executes a complex dance routine involving lariats and cowboys. Powell, in her introduction to the book Gotta Sing, Gotta Dance, recalled that she knocked herself unconscious while rehearsing a stunt for this sequence involving a rope and ultimately had to don a football helmet to protect herself. The final dance scene with Powell was taken from Born to Dance (1936).  Many of the physical gags were done by Buster Keaton in the film Spite Marriage (1929). Keaton had an uncredited role in writing gags for some of Skelton's early MGM films.

Skelton and Powell had previously worked together in Ship Ahoy (1942). In that film, they appeared with Tommy Dorsey, Jimmy's brother.

This was Powell's final starring role at MGM. After this, she would make a cameo appearance in Thousands Cheer, play a lead role in the  United Artists film Sensations of 1945, and return to MGM for a cameo in  Duchess of Idaho (1950) before retiring from the screen for good.

The rather ungrammatical title was from one of Red Skelton's radio catchphrases of the day.  In 1942 Jack Owens, The Cruising Crooner, wrote a song for Skelton based on it: "I Dood It! (If I Do, I Get a Whippin')", but that song does not appear in this film.

Jimmy Dorsey's theme song "Contrasts" appears in the film. He also performs the jazz and pop standard "Star Eyes" which he was the first to release. The film opens with the Jimmy Dorsey orchestra performing Count Basie's "One O'Clock Jump". As the tempo and energy of the music increases several couples can be seen dancing in the confined space in front of their theater seats, and other fans leave their seats to stand in front of the band stage.

Dance direction in the film was by Bobby Connolly, and the "Western Rope Dance," assisted by Bob Eberly and Jimmy Dorsey's Orchestra, is the second scene in the film.

Box office
According to MGM records the film earned $1,615,000 in the US and Canada and $542,000 elsewhere resulting in a profit of $319,000.

References

External links

 
 
 
 

1943 films
Metro-Goldwyn-Mayer films
American black-and-white films
Films directed by Vincente Minnelli
Films scored by Georgie Stoll
1943 musical comedy films
1943 romantic comedy films
American musical comedy films
American romantic comedy films
1940s romantic musical films
American romantic musical films
1940s English-language films
1940s American films